Marshall Lauren Miles (December 16, 1926 – February 5, 2013) was an American bridge player, teacher and writer.

Bridge career
Miles learned to play bridge largely from columns in the back issues of daily newspapers at a local public library.

Miles' crowning achievement was winning the World Senior Teams Olympiad in Istanbul in 2004. He won various other tournaments and titles throughout his bridge career, including the Fishbein Trophy and the Life Master Pairs in 1961, as well as the Spingold in that same year and the next. He won the Reisinger in 1962 and 1965 and placed second in the Men's Pairs twice as well as in the Vanderbilt and Fall National Open Pairs. Miles was an American Contract Bridge League (ACBL) Grand Life Master with more than 17,500 masterpoints and was elected into its Hall of Fame in 2005.

Miles wrote "many articles for The Bridge World, American Bridge Digest, Bridge Today, ACBL Bridge Bulletin and was a contributing editor to The Official Encyclopedia of Bridge."  He wrote several books including the classic All 52 Cards. (1963)

Personal

Born in Loma Linda, California, Miles graduated from Claremont College and the University of California, Los Angeles.  Miles earned a law degree in 1954 and practiced in Southern California from 1955 until his retirement in 1997. Miles was a teacher on The Bridge Forum, an online bridge site on which students from all over the world can learn from experts.

A resident of Redlands, California, Miles died of complications from a heart attack at Redlands Community Hospital, according to his family, on February 5, 2013, at the age of 86.

Bridge accomplishments

Honors
 ACBL Hall of Fame, Blackwood Award 2005

Awards
 Fishbein Trophy 1961
 Herman Trophy 1962

Wins
 Senior International Cup (1) 2004
 North American Bridge Championships (5)
 Spingold (2) 1961, 1962
 Reisinger (2) 1962, 1965
 Life Master Pairs (1) 1961

Runners-up
 North American Bridge Championships (5)
 Vanderbilt (1) 1961
 Senior Swiss Teams (1) 2003
 Fall National Open Pairs (1) 1962
 Men's Pairs (2) 1962, 1972
 United States Bridge Championships (1)
 Senior Team Trials (1) 2004

Publications

  
  UK Edition: 
 
  
 
 Reisinger Challenge (Los Alamitos, CA: C&T Bridge Supplies, 1997) 
 
 Inferences at Bridge (Master Point, 2002)
 Modern Constructive Bidding (Master Point, 2005)
 My System: The Unbalanced Diamond (Master Point, 2007)
 It's Your Call (Master Point, 2009)
 More Accurate Bidding (2011)

References

External links
 
 
  (including 1 "from old catalog")

1926 births
2013 deaths
American contract bridge players
Contract bridge writers
Claremont McKenna College alumni
University of California, Los Angeles alumni
People from Redlands, California
People from Loma Linda, California
20th-century American lawyers